The Caton Shales is a geologic formation in England. It preserves fossils dating back to the Carboniferous period.

See also

 List of fossiliferous stratigraphic units in England

References

 

Carboniferous System of Europe
Carboniferous England
Slate formations